The Austrian Cycling Federation or ORV (in German: Österreichischer Radsport-Verband) is the national governing body of cycle racing in Austria.

The ORV is a member of the UCI and the UEC.

External links
 Austrian Cycling Federation official website

National members of the European Cycling Union
Cycle racing organizations
Cy
Cycle racing in Austria